The term doblada may refer to:

Doblada, a type of empanada in Chilean cuisine
Doblada, a type of folded tortilla with filling in Guatemalan cuisine
Doblada, a folded tortilla covered with salsa in Mexican cuisine